Brown Township is one of the twenty townships of Darke County, Ohio, United States. The 2010 census found 2,073 people in the township, 899 of whom lived in the unincorporated portions of the township.

Geography
Located in the northern part of the county, it borders the following townships:
Allen Township - north
York Township - northeast
Richland Township - southeast
Greenville Township - south
Washington Township - southwest corner
Jackson Township - west

The village of Ansonia is located in eastern Brown Township.

Name and history
It is one of eight Brown Townships statewide.

One of the flattest townships in Darke County, it was very swampy; the land was only drained in the 1870s, well after the completion of a similar process in the county's other townships.>  Despite the wetness of the terrain, the first settler in the township, John Woodington, arrived prior to 1817, and the township's first church (a Church of Christ) and school were established in 1827.  The township was founded in December 1833; up to this point, it had been a part of Washington Township.

Government
The township is governed by a three-member board of trustees, who are elected in November of odd-numbered years to a four-year term beginning on the following January 1. Two are elected in the year after the presidential election and one is elected in the year before it. There is also an elected township fiscal officer, who serves a four-year term beginning on April 1 of the year after the election, which is held in November of the year before the presidential election. Vacancies in the fiscal officership or on the board of trustees are filled by the remaining trustees.  The current trustees are Ed Huff, Jr., Andy Prasuhn, and Rick Moody, and the clerk is Mary Riffle.

References

External links
County website

Townships in Darke County, Ohio
Townships in Ohio